Paul Fearing (February 28, 1762 – August 21, 1822) was an American politician who served as a delegate to the United States House of Representatives from the Northwest Territory.

Early life and education 
Fearing was born in Wareham, Province of Massachusetts Bay. He was prepared for college by tutors and graduated from Harvard University in 1785. He studied law in Windham, Connecticut and was admitted to the bar in 1787.

Career 
He moved to the Northwest Territory in May 1788 and engaged in the practice of law at Fort Harmar, now a part of Marietta, Ohio. He was the first lawyer to practice in the Northwest Territory.

Fearing was appointed the United States counsel for Washington County in 1788 and a probate judge in 1797. He was a member of the Territorial legislature from 1799 to 1801. He was elected as a Federalist a Delegate to the Seventh Congress (March 4, 1801 – March 3, 1803). He was not a candidate for renomination in 1802. He resumed the practice of law and engaged in fruit and stock raising. He was appointed associate judge of the court of common pleas in 1810 and served seven years. He was appointed master in chancery in 1814.  Fearing was elected a member of the American Antiquarian Society in 1816.

Death 
He died at his home near Marietta, Ohio in 1822. He was buried in Harmar Cemetery, Marietta.

References

Further reading
Bloom, Jo Tice. "The Congressional Delegates from the Northwest Territory, 1799-1803." The Old Northwest 3 (March 1977): 3-21.

1762 births
1822 deaths
Burials in Ohio
Delegates to the United States House of Representatives from the Northwest Territory
Harvard University alumni
Members of the American Antiquarian Society
Northwest Territory House of Representatives
Ohio Federalists
Ohio state court judges
People from Wareham, Massachusetts
People from Windham, Connecticut
Politicians from Marietta, Ohio